Simon Whitlock (born 3 March 1969) is an Australian professional darts player who plays in Professional Darts Corporation (PDC) tournaments, having also played in the British Darts Organisation (BDO) between 2004 and 2009. He uses the nickname The Wizard for his matches. His walk-on music is "Down Under" by Men at Work.

His greatest achievements to date are winning the 2012 European Championship and 2022 World Cup of Darts for Australia with Damon Heta.
Whitlock has also finished runner-up at the 2008 BDO World Darts Championship and the 2010 PDC World Darts Championship. He claimed that the prize money gained from the latter tournament which included money for the highest checkout (joint with Phil Taylor) would allow him to move over to the UK from Australia and compete on the PDC Pro Tour. His defeat also made him the first, and  only, player to have never won a World Championship after reaching both the BDO and PDC World Championship Final. He is widely regarded as the greatest Australian dart player of all time and is to thank for the rejuvenated popularity of darts in Australia and Oceania.

Early darts career

He reached the last 16 of the 2003 PDC World Darts Championship and also the semi-finals of the 2005 BDO World Darts Championship but lost heavily 0–5 to Martin Adams. In other events, he has also reached the semi-finals of the International Darts League in 2005 (losing to Mervyn King) and 2006 (defeating Phil Taylor, losing to Raymond van Barneveld).

In 1999/2000 Kevin Berlyn Formed the DPA (Dartplayers Australia) and the Australian Grand Prix – a series of tournaments in Whitlock's native country, and Whitlock won the first two events. The eventual winner of the AGP would have received automatic qualification for the 2008 PDC World Championship; however, Whitlock remained a WDF/BDO player and chose to compete in the BDO World Championship instead. Whitlock showed great form throughout the tournament, beating Edwin Max and Fabian Roosenbrand before defeating former world champion Ted Hankey 5–0 in the quarter-finals. He then beat Brian Woods to reach the final, where he lost to the number one seed Mark Webster 7–5. He was the first Australian to reach the final since Tony David won the tournament in 2002.

Whitlock entered the 2009 BDO World Darts Championship as the number 12 seed and reached the second round by beating Mark Barilli, but lost to Darryl Fitton.

Return to PDC
After many weeks of speculation, Whitlock returned to the PDC on 19 March 2009.
He began playing in the AGP circuit where he won eight tournaments. He qualified for the Las Vegas Desert Classic but lost in the first round of the televised stages against Terry Jenkins.

He played in the 2009 Grand Slam of Darts and performed well in the Group stages winning all 3 of his games against Ted Hankey, Wayne Mardle and Scott Waites. In the Last 16 he thrashed 1996 BDO World Champion Steve Beaton 10–1 but lost to eventual runner up Scott Waites in a tight encounter.

At the 2010 PDC World Championship, Whitlock made a great impression, beating Colin Osborne (3–1), Wayne Jones (4–0) and Terry Jenkins (4–2), before going on to beat James Wade 5–3 in an epic encounter, setting up a semi final clash against Raymond van Barneveld which he won 6–5, after falling 4-2 behind. In the final against Phil Taylor, he lost the first set before winning the next two, including his second 170 checkout of the tournament, but Taylor would also make his second 170 checkout later in the match and went on to win 7–3.

During the championships, Whitlock made a televised post-match appeal for sponsorship during a Sky Sports interview. As a result of his performances, he did earn a sponsorship deal, enabling him to move to the UK and compete on the PDC Pro Tour full-time. After his run to the World Championship final, it was announced that he would be competing in the 2010 Premier League Darts as a wild card. He finished second in the table, therefore qualified for the semi-finals, after having beaten Raymond van Barneveld (twice), Adrian Lewis, Mervyn King (twice), Terry Jenkins and James Wade in the process. His run came to an end in the semis where he was beaten 8-6 by eventual runner-up Wade.
 
Whitlock's trademark in darts is his big finishing and superb checking out. In the 2010 Premier League, Whitlock had a 50% success rate in checking out, stretching 14 weeks.

On his World Matchplay debut in 2010, Whitlock reached the semi-finals before losing to Phil Taylor.  At the 2010 Grand Slam of Darts, he lost all three of his group matches against Dave Chisnall, Colin Osborne and Robert Thornton.

Whitlock represented his native Australia alongside Paul Nicholson during the inaugural PDC World Cup of Darts in December 2010, losing out in the semi-finals to the Welsh pairing of Mark Webster and Barrie Bates.

2011–2012

At the 2011 PDC World Darts Championship, Whitlock defeated Steve Evans 3–0 in the first round, and Denis Ovens 4–0 in the second round, before losing 2–4 to Vincent van der Voort in the third round. He competed in the 2011 Premier League, again as a wildcard, but failed to qualify for the play-offs after finishing sixth.

During the 2011 PDC Pro Tour, he became the first player to hit nine-dart finishes in successive Pro Tour events. His first came in the Bobby Bourn Memorial Players Championship in Barnsley on 12 June, during his win against South African Devon Petersen. His second came in the Dutch Darts Trophy event in Nuland six days later, against Nigel Heydon.

At the 2011 World Matchplay, Whitlock defeated Peter Wright 10–7 and Denis Ovens 13–1 to reach the quarter-finals, where he played Andy Hamilton. Whitlock was leading 15–8 and within one leg of victory, when Hamilton fought back, winning nine consecutive legs to take the match 17–15.

Whitlock broke a bone in his ankle while playing in Benidorm in November 2011 and was forced to withdraw from the 2011 Grand Slam of Darts and 2011 Players Championship Finals. He did not play again until the 2012 World Championship and, with only a weeks practice behind him, produced a stunning performance to beat Dennis Smith 3–0, with an average of 105. He continued his form to ease past Steve Beaton 4–1 in the second round. Whitlock let a 3–0 lead slip to 3–3 in the last 16 against Michael van Gerwen but held his nerve to win the deciding set, and then comfortably beat Gary Anderson 5–1 to set up a semi-final clash with Andy Hamilton. He led 5–3, to need just one more set to reach his second PDC World Championship final, but his opponent raised his game and Whitlock bowed out of the tournament. Whitlock said after the match that he had had a fantastic tournament, considering he wasn't supposed to play.

Whitlock partnered Nicholson again for the 2012 PDC World Cup of Darts to try to improve on the semi-final the pair reached in 2010. Together they enjoyed comfortable victories over Ireland, Belgium and the Netherlands to indeed better 2010 and reach their first World Cup final, where they played the English pair of Phil Taylor and Adrian Lewis. Whitlock lost both of his singles matches in the final, but Nicholson won his final match and the duo won the doubles to mean the title would be decided on a sudden-death leg. Whitlock and Nicholson both missed two darts each to win the match, with Adrian Lewis hitting the winning double for England.

He was a Sky Sports pick for the Premier League. Whitlock won seven of his fourteen league games, including 100-plus averages in victories over Gary Anderson and Kevin Painter, to finish 2nd in the table and therefore qualify for the play-offs. Whitlock played Andy Hamilton in the semi-finals, against whom he drew 7–7 and lost 4–8 during the league campaign. He hit a nine darter in the second leg of the semi-final, but this was the only leg he could win early on as he trailed 1–4. Whitlock came back into the match and took the lead for the first time at 7–6, before holding throw to reach his first Premier League final. There he played Phil Taylor and looked to heading for a tame defeat as Taylor led 7–2. Whitlock, though, hit back brilliantly to win five successive legs to level the match, but couldn't complete another comeback victory as Taylor reeled off 3 legs to win 10–7.

He reached the semi-final of the first UK Open qualifier before losing to Kim Huybrechts 6–4 after earlier beating Prakash Jiwa, Johnny Haines, Mark Frost, Alex Roy, Colin Osborne and Sean White. He also reached the semi-final of the second event a day later, beating Andy Smith, Brian Woods, Shaun Griffiths, Dave Honey, and Mick Todd, before losing to Michael van Gerwen 6–0. At the UK Open itself Whitlock lost in the last 16 to Dave Chisnall 5–9. Whitlock hit a nine=darter in his second round match at the European Tour Event 1 against Joe Cullen, but went on to lose 4–6. At the World Matchplay, Whitlock lost five legs in a row to succumb to a 6–10 defeat against van Gerwen in the first round.

Whitlock won his first ranking event title for almost two years in September, with a 6–4 victory over Andy Hamilton in the final of the 12th Players Championship. He then continued his form at the following week's European Championship, by capturing his maiden major title. He beat Mark Walsh 6–2 in the first round, before overcoming Dave Chisnall 10–5 in the second, marking the first time Whitlock has beaten Chisnall in his career following seven prior defeats. Further wins over Colin Lloyd (10–7) and Kim Huybrechts (11–9) ensued, to make his fourth major PDC final. Whitlock comfortably took the title with an 11–5 win over Wes Newton and stated afterwards that he wanted to win the World Championship and become world number one in the future. Whitlock moved up to five in the rankings after the event. Whitlock then won his first European Tour title at the Dutch Darts Masters as he produced some remarkably consistent darts to win 36 legs during the tournament, whilst only dropping 11. He saw off compatriot and World Cup partner Paul Nicholson 6–1 in a first all-Aussie final on the PDC ProTour.

Whitlock qualified from Group 5 of the Championship League and finished third in the Winners Group to reach the play-offs. He beat Jamie Caven 6–4, before losing 4–6 to Taylor in the final, having missed one dart to square the match at 5–5. He then won his second Players Championship of the year with a 6–2 defeat of Dennis Priestley in the final. At the Grand Slam of Darts, Whitlock won his opening two group games, but then lost 1–5 to Dean Winstanley to exit the tournament on leg difference. After all 33 ProTour events of 2012 had been played, Whitlock finished second on the Order of Merit to qualify for the Players Championship Finals where he beat Jamie Caven 6–3 in the first round. Whitlock then produced his highest ever televised average of 109.54 in a 10–1 win over Ronnie Baxter. He next won against Gary Anderson 10–8, but was then punished for hitting just 13% of his doubles against Phil Taylor in the semi-finals as he was heavily beaten 2–11. Nevertheless, following the tournament he moved up to 4th in the PDC Order of Merit, his highest position to date.

2013
Whitlock won his first two matches in the 2013 World Championship without dropping a set and then in a deciding set against Dave Chisnall, he took out a crucial 152 checkout to stay in the match, following it up with two successive legs to advance to the quarter-finals. However, he ran into an in-form Raymond van Barneveld who averaged 102.32 in defeating the Australian 5–1. In his third World Cup of Darts with Paul Nicholson the pair were shocked in the last 16 when the Belgian brothers of Ronny and Kim Huybrechts defeated them 1–5.

His European Championship win in 2012 earned him a spot in the 2013 Premier League. Whitlock could only win three of his first nine games to avoid relegation by just one point after week nine. Consecutive wins over Robert Thornton, Andy Hamilton and Michael van Gerwen followed to improve Whitlock's chances of securing a play-off spot, and he went into the final night needing wins from matches against Adrian Lewis and Raymond van Barneveld. However, he could only draw 6–6 with Lewis and lost 4–7 to van Barneveld to finish the season sixth in the table.

Whitlock won his first tournament of 2013 at the fifth UK Open Qualifier. He came back from 1–5 down against Ian White in the quarter-finals to triumph 6–5, saw off Peter Wright 6–4 in the semis, before powering past world number two Michael van Gerwen 6–1 in the final. Van Gerwen exacted revenge in the final of the European Darts Open in Düsseldorf, Germany, by beating Whitlock 6–2 in the final. Whitlock had earlier defeated Tomas Seyler, Arron Monk, James Wade, Justin Pipe and Jamie Caven in the event. Whitlock lost 4–9 to Wes Newton in the third round of the UK Open. In the defence of his European Championship title, Whitlock pulled off the comeback of his career in the quarter-finals against Jamie Caven, as from 3–9 down he won seven unanswered legs to win 10–9, sealing his victory with a 146 checkout when Caven was waiting on 56. Whitlock's play was later named the televised performance of the year at the PDC Annual Awards. He then beat Ronny Huybrechts 11–7 in the semis, but could not quite capture a second successive title as Adrian Lewis defeated him 6–11 in the final. He reached the final of the eighth Players Championship with impressive performances as he averaged 105 in a win against Colin Osborne and 111 in a 6–2 success over Raymond van Barneveld. In the final Ian White beat Whitlock 6–3. He was then involved in two matches where he seemed to become distracted by the other player. In the quarter-finals of the Masters he let a 7–4 lead turn into an 8–7 defeat against James Wade and walked from the stage before the two had shaken hands; and at the Grand Slam of Darts Ted Hankey slowed Whitlock down and reacted aggressively to the crowd and every good shot to come back from 6–1 down to defeat Whitlock 10–9.

2014
Whitlock didn't lose a set in reaching the quarter-finals of the 2014 World Championship and kept his composure when Ian White levelled the match at 4–4, after having been 3–0 and 4–1 down, to win 5–4. However, he was outplayed in every department by Peter Wright in the semi-finals as he lost 6–2. Despite this, Whitlock moved up to third in the world rankings after the tournament. He lost 9–6 to Ronny Huybrechts in the third round of the UK Open and refused to shake his opponent's hand at the end of the game. Whitlock had a very poor Premier League campaign as he only won one of his nine matches to be eliminated from the competition. His season was perhaps best summarised in the ninth week when he hit a 170 finish to lead world number one Michael van Gerwen 6–2, but went on to draw 6–6. Whitlock and Nicholson won through to the semi-finals of the World Cup of Darts where they faced England's Phil Taylor and Adrian Lewis in a repeat of 2012's final. Whitlock was beaten 4–1 by Taylor, before Nicholson overcame Lewis 4–2 to mean a doubles match was required to settle the tie which Australia lost 4–0. Whitlock won his first tournament in over a year at the 12th Players Championship by beating James Wade 6–3 in the final. He won through to the final of the European Darts Open, but lost 6–2 against Wright.

At the World Matchplay, Whitlock recorded wins over Kevin Painter, Raymond van Barneveld and James Wade (after being 5–0 down in the latter two) to reach the semi-finals of the event for the second time, with Whitlock stating he was playing his best darts in five years. He was defeated 17–13 by Michael van Gerwen and also lost to the Dutchman in the final of the Singapore Darts Masters this time 11–8. Whitlock had a very poor second half of the year as he was eliminated in the first round of the World Grand Prix, European Championship, Masters and Players Championship Finals, as well as the group stage of the Grand Slam of Darts.

2015
Whitlock's disappointing play continued into the 2015 World Championship when he was beaten 3–1 by Darren Webster in the first round, hitting just 17% of his doubles in the process. Whitlock did not receive a wildcard to compete in the Premier League, meaning he missed the event for the first time since 2009. He lost 9–5 against Robert Thornton in the third round of the UK Open. Whitlock and Nicholson were knocked out in the quarter-finals of the World Cup following a 4–2 doubles defeat against Belgium.
After Whitlock was defeated in the second round of both the World Matchplay (13–9 by Ian White) and World Grand Prix (3–0 in sets by Mensur Suljović) it meant he had gone over a year without an appearance in a major quarter-final.
The run continued until November when he beat Brendan Dolan 6–2 at the Players Championship Finals and then forced a final leg decider against Peter Wright. Both players missed four match darts, but it was Whitlock who would progress to his first quarter in 18 months, where he lost 10–7 to Adrian Lewis.

2016
Whitlock missed two darts to beat Ricky Evans 3–0 in the first round of the 2016 World Championship and went on to lose six successive legs to be pegged back to 2–2. Evans took out a 130 finish to win the deciding set by six legs to four and condemn Whitlock to a second successive first round exit in the event.
In the UK Open Qualifiers Whitlock wore glasses in a tournament for the first time. In the second qualifier he got to the semi-finals before losing 6–4 to Van Gerwen. Whitlock lost 9–3 to Benito van de Pas in the fourth round of the UK Open and 10–6 to Michael Smith in the first round of the World Matchplay. In October, at the 18th Players Championship Whitlock ended Michael van Gerwen's eight ranking tournament winning streak by beating him 6–3. He then overcame Justin Pipe and Steve West both 6–1 and recovered from 3–0 down against Ronny Huybrechts in the final to win 6–5. It was Whitlock's first title in over two years and he said afterwards that it was just the start of him getting back to his best.

In the deciding set of his second round match with Alan Norris at the World Grand Prix, Whitlock was 2–1 down in legs, before hitting a 180, a 150 checkout, followed by a 10-darter to end the match with 16 perfect darts. In his first major quarter-final of the year he lost 3–1 to Van Gerwen. He quickly added another title by capturing the 19th Players Championship with a 6–4 win over Chris Dobey.

2017

Whitlock was beaten 4–0 in the second round of the 2017 World Championship as Darren Webster averaged 104.64. In the final of the second UK Open Qualifier Whitlock took out a 154 finish with his opponent Gary Anderson waiting on 20 to lead 5–3 and went on to win 6–4. He also claimed the fifth event by seeing off Ronny Huybrechts 6–3. At the main event progressed through to the quarter-finals and held a 7–4 advantage over Daryl Gurney, before losing five legs in a row. Whitlock fought back to force a last leg shoot-out, but lost it to be defeated 10–9. His third ranking event title of 2017 came a week later as he overcame Gary Anderson 6–5 in the quarter-finals and Kim Huybrechts 6–4 in the semis, before dispatching Darren Johnson 6–3 to win the fourth Players Championship.

2020
After a drop in rankings and form over 2019, Whitlock enjoyed a more successful 2020, featuring two televised semi-final appearances, in the World Grand Prix & Grand Slam, as well as a quarter-final in the World Matchplay. Notably each of these appearances happened as a result of Whitlock beating World No. 1 Michael van Gerwen in the round prior to his elimination, including his 16–15 Grand Slam defeat of van Gerwen where Whitlock failed to lead in the first 30 legs but won the deciding leg. Whitlock also hit a Grand Slam record 20 180s in a match during that win against van Gerwen.

Personal life
Whitlock has three sons from two previous marriages: Nicholas (born 1991), Mason (born 2003), and Locky (born 2007).
He is a fan of Portsmouth F.C. as well as being a big fan of American football and Rugby union.

In 2012, Whitlock, together with the seven other players who competed in the Premier League, recorded a charity single with Chas Hodges and his band called 'Got My Tickets for the Darts' which was written by Chas. It was released on 18 May, the night after the play-offs at the O2 in London, where it was premiered. Proceeds from the single were donated to the Haven House Children's Hospice.

World Championship performances

BDO
 2005: Semi-finals (lost to Martin Adams 0–5)
 2006: Second round (lost to Paul Hanvidge 2–4)
 2007: Second round (lost to Niels de Ruiter 3–4)
 2008: Runner-up (lost to Mark Webster 5–7)
 2009: Second round (lost to Darryl Fitton 2–4)

PDC
 2003: Third round (lost to Richie Burnett 3–5)
 2010: Runner-up (lost to Phil Taylor 3–7)
 2011: Third round (lost to Vincent van der Voort 2–4)
 2012: Semi-finals (lost to Andy Hamilton 5–6)
 2013: Quarter-finals (lost to Raymond van Barneveld 1–5)
 2014: Semi-finals (lost to Peter Wright 2–6)
 2015: First round (lost to Darren Webster 1–3)
 2016: First round (lost to Ricky Evans 2–3) 
 2017: Second round (lost to Darren Webster 0–4)
 2018: Second round (lost to Darren Webster 1–4)
 2019: Second round (lost to Ryan Joyce 0–3)
 2020: Fourth round (lost to Gerwyn Price 2–4)
 2021: Third round (lost to Krzysztof Ratajski 0–4)
 2022: Second round (lost to Martijn Kleermaker 1–3)
 2023: Second round (lost to José de Sousa 2–3)

Career finals

BDO major finals: 1 (1 runner-up)

PDC major finals: 7 (1 title, 6 runners-up)

PDC world series finals: 1 (1 runner-up)

PDC team finals: 2 (1 title, 1 runner-up)

Career statistics

(W) Won; (F) finalist; (SF) semifinalist; (QF) quarterfinalist; (#R) rounds 6, 5, 4, 3, 2, 1; (RR) round-robin stage; (Prel.) Preliminary round; (DNQ) Did not qualify; (DNP) Did not participate; (NH) Not held; (WD) Withdrew

Performance timeline

PDC European Tour

Nine-dart finishes

High averages

See also
 List of darts players who have switched organisation

Notes

References

External links
Official website

Management Website

{{#ifexpr:<21|}}

1969 births
Australian darts players
Living people
Sportspeople from Newcastle, New South Wales
People from the Hunter Region
Professional Darts Corporation current tour card holders
British Darts Organisation players
European Championship (darts) champions
Darts players who have thrown televised nine-dart games
PDC World Cup of Darts Australian championship team